Momba located at  is a cadastral parish of Ularara County New South Wales.

Located on the Paroo River the main  economic activity of the parish is agriculture and the climate is semi-arid, featuring low rainfall, very hot summer temperatures and cool nights in winter. The parish has a Köppen climate classification of BWh (Hot desert).

References

Parishes of Ularara County
Far West (New South Wales)